Lait may refer to:

 Jack Lait (1883–1954), American journalist
 Jacqui Lait (born 1947), British Conservative politician
 Liban Lait, a Lebanese dairy farm